Tsin may refer to:

Mace (unit), known in Hong Kong as Tsin
Irregular spelling of Jin (disambiguation)
Irregular spelling of Qin (disambiguation)

See also
Tsing (disambiguation)